Comitas suluensis is a species of sea snail, a marine gastropod mollusc in the family Pseudomelatomidae,.

Description
The length of the shell attains 21 mm , its diameter 7 mm.

Distribution
This marine species occurs in the Sulu Sea, the Philippines.

References

  Powell, A.W.B. 1969. The family Turridae in the Indo-Pacific. Part. 2. The subfamily Turriculinae. Indo-Pacific Mollusca 2(10): 207–415, pls 188–324

External links
 
 Biolib.cz: Comitas suluensis

suluensis
Gastropods described in 1969